The Boston mayoral election of 1877 saw the election of Henry L. Pierce, who unseated incumbent mayor Frederick O. Prince.

Results

See also
List of mayors of Boston, Massachusetts

References

Mayoral elections in Boston
Boston
Boston mayoral
19th century in Boston